The Municipality of Log-Dragomer is a small municipality to the southwest of Ljubljana in the Inner Carniola region of Slovenia. It was created in 2006, when it split from the Municipality of Vrhnika. The seat of the municipality is the town of Log pri Brezovici.

Settlements
In addition to the municipal seat of Log pri Brezovici, the municipality also includes the settlements of Dragomer and Lukovica pri Brezovici.

References

External links
 
 Municipality of Log-Dragomer on Geopedia
 Log-Dragomer municipal website

 
Log-Dragomer
2006 establishments in Slovenia